Holy Trinity Barbecue (sometimes Holy Trinity BBQ) was a barbecue restaurant in Portland, Oregon.

Description
Holy Trinity operated from a food cart in a parking lot along Powell Boulevard in southeast Portland's Creston-Kenilworth neighborhood. The menu included Texas-style brisket, Czech sausages, and ribs. Sides included cheesy grits and pickles.

History
Pitmaster Kyle Rensmeyer opened Holy Trinity in 2019. The business initially operated on weekends, and expanded to Thursday and Friday service in August 2019. Rensmeyer closed the food cart for two days during a heat wave in July 2021, resulting in a loss of $7,000. In October 2021, he confirmed plans to close in October 23.

Reception

In 2019, Holy Trinity was a finalist in the Food Cart of the Year category of Eater Portland Eater Awards. The website's Brooke Jackson-Glidden said, "Portland is already spoiled on the barbecue front; it didn’t need another hardcore talent with a smoker. But the Texas barbecue at Jojo's neighbor, Holy Trinity, is far better than it needs to be, with gorgeous brisket, well-seasoned sausages, and knockout green-chile-cheese grits." Additionally, Jackson-Glidden named Rensmeyer a "rising star" in the city's food and drink scene.

In 2021, Jackson-Glidden and Nick Woo included Holy Trinity in Eater Portland list of "15 Outstanding Portland Food Carts". Jackson-Glidden also included Holy Trinity in the site's 2021 list of "The 38 Essential Restaurants and Food Carts in Portland".

See also

 List of barbecue restaurants
 List of defunct restaurants of the United States
 List of food trucks

References

External links

 

2019 establishments in Oregon
2021 disestablishments in Oregon
Barbecue restaurants in Oregon
Creston-Kenilworth, Portland, Oregon
Defunct barbecue restaurants
Defunct restaurants in Portland, Oregon
Food carts in Portland, Oregon
Food trucks
Restaurants disestablished during the COVID-19 pandemic
Restaurants disestablished in 2021
Restaurants established in 2019